Md. Sirajul Huq Talukder is a Bangladesh Nationalist Party politician and the former Member of Parliament of Bogra-5.

Career
Talukder was elected to the East Pakistan State Assembly in 1954 as a Muslim League candidate. He was elected to parliament from Bogra-5 as a Bangladesh Nationalist Party candidate in 1979.

Death
Talukder died on 21 September 1981 in Bangabandhu Sheikh Mujib Medical University, Dhaka, Bangladesh.

References

Bangladesh Nationalist Party politicians
1981 deaths
2nd Jatiya Sangsad members